Isaiah Emmanuel Wynn (born December 9, 1995) is an American football offensive tackle for the New England Patriots of the National Football League (NFL). He played college football at Georgia and was selected by the Patriots in the first round of the 2018 NFL Draft.

College career
Wynn played 11 games for the Georgia Bulldogs as a true freshman. During the 2015 and 2016 seasons, Wynn started 25 of 26 games, making 23 straight starts until he missed a game against Louisiana due to injury. Prior to the 2017 season, Wynn missed several practices due to illness. On December 11, 2017, Wynn was named a Second-team All-American.

Wynn majored in human development and family sciences.

Professional career

Wynn was drafted by the New England Patriots with the 23rd overall pick in the first round of the 2018 NFL Draft, using a pick acquired from the Los Angeles Rams in a trade that sent Brandin Cooks to Los Angeles. He was the second of six Georgia Bulldogs to be selected that year. In addition, Wynn and Sony Michel were the first pair of college teammates selected by the same team in the first round since Auburn players Jason Campbell and Carlos Rogers were taken in the 2005 NFL Draft by the Washington Redskins.

In the second game of the preseason, Wynn suffered a torn Achilles and was ruled out for the 2018 season. He was placed on injured reserve on September 1, 2018. Without Wynn, the Patriots won Super Bowl LIII against the Los Angeles Rams 13-3.

Wynn entered the 2019 season as the Patriots starting left tackle. In Week 2, Wynn suffered a toe injury in the Patriots 43–0 shutout win against the Miami Dolphins. On September 17, 2019, the Patriots placed Wynn on injured reserve as a result of the toe injury he suffered in Week 2 against the Miami Dolphins. He was designated for return from injured reserve on October 30, 2019, and began practicing with the team again. He was activated on November 19, 2019.

The Patriots opened the 2020 with Wynn as their left tackle, but in week 6 he started at left guard for the first time in his pro career. He was placed on injured reserve on November 28, 2020 after suffering a knee injury in Week 11.

The Patriots exercised the fifth-year option on Wynn's contract on May 3, 2021, which guarantees a salary of $10.413 million for the 2022 season. He was moved over to right tackle with veteran Trent Brown moving over to the left side. He suffered a foot injury in Week 11, missed the next three games before being placed on injured reserve on December 17, 2022.

References

External links
Georgia Bulldogs bio
New England Patriots bio

1995 births
Living people
American football offensive linemen
Georgia Bulldogs football players
New England Patriots players
Players of American football from St. Petersburg, Florida